This is a list of public libraries in Los Angeles County, California:

 County of Los Angeles Public Library - 7.8 million items
 Los Angeles Public Library - 6.3 million items
 Alhambra Civic Center Library
 Altadena Library District
 Arcadia Public Library
 Azusa City Library
 Beverly Hills Public Library
 Burbank Public Library
 Cerritos Millennium Library
 Covina Public Library
 Crowell Public Library, San Marino
 Downey City Library
 El Segundo Public Library
 Glendale Public Library
 Glendora Library
 Hacienda Heights Library
 Inglewood Public Library
 Katy Geissert Civic Center Library, Torrance
 Long Beach Public Library
 Monterey Park Bruggemeyer Library
 Palos Verdes Library District
 Pasadena Public Library
 Pomona Public Library
 Redondo Beach Public Library
 San Marino Public Library
 Santa Clarita Public Library
 Santa Monica Public Library
Sierra Madre Public Library
 Whittier Public Library

See also 
 List of the largest libraries in the United States
 Los Angeles County
 Books in the United States